Thasunda Brown Duckett (born July 22, 1973) is an American businesswoman who serves as the president and chief executive officer (CEO) of TIAA. She is also a former CEO of Chase Consumer Banking, a division of JP Morgan, and a member of the board of directors of Nike.

Duckett was born in Rochester, New York. She later moved to Texas with her parents, where she graduated from Sam Houston High School. She attended the University of Houston, receiving a Bachelor's degree in Finance and Marketing. She enrolled at Baylor University, where she earned an  MBA. 

Duckett founded and chairs The Otis and Rosie Brown Foundation to continue the legacy of her parents.

On May 1, 2021, she became the CEO of the Teachers Insurance and Annuity Association of America (TIAA), making her the fourth Black woman in history to serve as a Fortune 500 CEO, and one of two female Black American CEOs to then lead a Fortune 500 company.

References 

American bankers
1973 births
Living people